Men Without Fear (French: Les hommes sans peur) is a 1942 French drama film directed by Yvan Noé and starring Madeleine Sologne, Claude Dauphin and Janine Darcey.

It was partly shot at the Victorine Studios in Nice in the Unoccupied Zone of France. The film's sets were designed by Jean Douarinou.

Cast
 Madeleine Sologne as Madeleine  
 Claude Dauphin as Henri Vermont  
 Janine Darcey as Denise  
 Jean Murat as Le professeur Bellecour  
 Pierrette Caillol as Le précurseur  
 Gérard Landry as Jacques Monval  
 Marthe Régnier as La malade 
 Georges Alain as Pierre  
 Jean d'Yd as Un médecin  
 Lucien Dalmas as Le chanteur  
 Jean Daurand as Joseph  
 Roger Hédouin 
 Georges Lannes as Gérard  
 Emmi Laurence 
 Jean-François Martial 
 Marcel Millet 
 René Noel 
 Arlette Perretière 
 Jean Stoll as Un danseur  
 Maurice Tricard as Le père de Madeleine  
 Michèle Verneuil 
 Pierrette Vial

References

Bibliography 
 Rège, Philippe. Encyclopedia of French Film Directors, Volume 1. Scarecrow Press, 2009.

External links 
 

1942 films
French drama films
1942 drama films
1940s French-language films
Films directed by Yvan Noé
French black-and-white films
Films shot at Victorine Studios
1940s French films